Psychedelic Jungle is the second album by the American rock band the Cramps. It was released in May 1981 on I.R.S. Records. It was engineered by Paul McKenna and recorded in January 1981 at A&M Studios. It was self-produced by the Cramps. The photo on the back cover of the album was taken by the noted photographer and director Anton Corbijn.

Only half of the album's 14 tracks are original compositions, written by guitarist Poison Ivy Rorschach and singer Lux Interior. The rest are cover versions of rock and roll, rockabilly, and garage rock singles from the 1950s and 1960s; these include "Green Door" by Jim Lowe (1956), "Jungle Hop" by Kip Tyler and the Flips (1958), "Rockin' Bones" by Ronnie Dawson (1959), "Goo Goo Muck" by Ronnie Cook and the Gaylads (1962), "The Crusher" by the Novas (1964), "Primitive" by the Groupies (1966), and "Green Fuz" by Green Fuz (1969).

The single "Goo Goo Muck" later appeared on the soundtrack to the 1986 film Texas Chainsaw Massacre 2. "Goo Goo Muck" also appeared on the soundtrack of the Wednesday (TV series) in 2022.

Track listing
Writing credits adapted from the album's liner notes.

Personnel

The Cramps
 Lux Interior – vocals
 Poison Ivy Rorschach – guitar
 Kid Congo Powers – guitar
 Nick Knox – drums

Technical
 Paul McKenna – engineer
 Donna Santisi – front cover photography
 Anton Corbijn – back cover photography

Notes and references

1981 albums
The Cramps albums
I.R.S. Records albums
Illegal Records albums